Otamanzi Constituency is an electoral constituency in the Omusati Region of Namibia. It had 13,495 inhabitants in 2004 and 7,427 registered voters . Its district capital is the settlement of Otamanzi, it further contains the settlements of Onandjo, Kelimwe, Etilyasa, Onanyala, Onkani, Iiyekeya, Epato, Amarika, Etsikilo, and Onkaankaa, Okeendapa

Politics
Otamanzi constituency is traditionally a stronghold of the South West Africa People's Organization (SWAPO) party. In the 2015 local and regional elections SWAPO candidate Johannes Iiyambo won uncontested and became councillor after no opposition party nominated a candidate. Councillor Iiyambo (SWAPO) was reelected in the 2020 regional election. He obtained 3,325 votes, far ahead of Petrus Amunimwe of the Independent Patriots for Change (IPC, an opposition party formed in August 2020), who obtained 332 votes.

References

Constituencies of Omusati Region
States and territories established in 1992
1992 establishments in Namibia